The R425 road is a regional road in County Laois in  Ireland. From south to north to runs from Abbeyleix to Ballyroan to the hamlet of Cashel and then joins the R445 east of Portlaoise. It is a road of  running almost parallel to the N77.

See also
Roads in Ireland
National primary road
National secondary road

References
Roads Act 1993 (Classification of Regional Roads) Order 2006 – Department of Transport

Regional roads in the Republic of Ireland
Roads in County Laois